Ion Sburlea (born 7 January 1971) is a Romanian former footballer who played as a midfielder and defender.

Honours
Steaua București
Divizia A: 1992–93
Cupa României: 1991–92
FC Universitatea Craiova
Cupa României runner-up: 1993–94
Național București
Cupa României runner-up: 1996–97

References

1971 births
Living people
Romanian footballers
Association football defenders
Romania under-21 international footballers
Liga I players
Liga II players
Cypriot First Division players
Primeira Liga players
CS Universitatea Craiova players
FC U Craiova 1948 players
FC Dinamo București players
FC Progresul București players
CSM Jiul Petroșani players
FC Steaua București players
CSM Ceahlăul Piatra Neamț players
FC Astra Giurgiu players
Apollon Limassol FC players
C.S. Marítimo players
Romanian expatriate footballers
Expatriate footballers in Cyprus
Romanian expatriate sportspeople in Cyprus
Expatriate footballers in Portugal
Romanian expatriate sportspeople in Portugal
People from Târgu Cărbunești